Nebraska was admitted to the Union on March 1, 1867, and elects its United States senators to Class 1 and Class 2. George W. Norris was the longest serving senator (served 1913–1943). Nebraska's current senators are Republicans Deb Fischer (since 2013) and Pete Ricketts (since 2023).

List of senators

|- style="height:2em"
! rowspan=5 | 1
| rowspan=5 align=left | Thomas Tipton
| rowspan=5  | Republican
| rowspan=5 nowrap | Mar 1, 1867 –Mar 3, 1875
| rowspan=2 | Elected in 1867.
| rowspan=2 | 1
| 
| rowspan=3 | 1
| rowspan=3 | Elected in 1867.Lost re-election.
| rowspan=3 nowrap | Mar 1, 1867 –Mar 3, 1871
| rowspan=3  | Republican
| rowspan=3 align=right | John Thayer
! rowspan=3 | 1

|- style="height:2em"
| 

|- style="height:2em"
| rowspan=3 | Re-elected in 1869.
| rowspan=3 | 2
| 

|- style="height:2em"
| 
| rowspan=3 | 2
| rowspan=3 | Elected in 1870.Lost re-election.
| rowspan=3 nowrap | Mar 4, 1871 –Mar 3, 1877
| rowspan=3  | Republican
| rowspan=3 align=right | Phineas Hitchcock
! rowspan=3 | 2

|- style="height:2em"
| 

|- style="height:2em"
! rowspan=3 | 2
| rowspan=3 align=left | Algernon Paddock
| rowspan=3  | Republican
| rowspan=3 nowrap | Mar 4, 1875 –Mar 3, 1881
| rowspan=3 | Elected in 1875.Lost re-election.
| rowspan=3 | 3
| 

|- style="height:2em"
| 
| rowspan=3 | 3
| rowspan=3 | Elected in 1877.
| rowspan=3 nowrap | Mar 5, 1877 –Mar 3, 1883
| rowspan=3  | Republican
| rowspan=3 align=right | Alvin Saunders
! rowspan=3 | 3

|- style="height:2em"
| 

|- style="height:2em"
! rowspan=3 | 3
| rowspan=3 align=left | Charles Van Wyck
| rowspan=3  | Republican
| rowspan=3 nowrap | Mar 4, 1881 –Mar 3, 1887
| rowspan=3 | Elected in 1880.Lost re-election.
| rowspan=3 | 4
| 

|- style="height:2em"
| 
| rowspan=3 | 4
| rowspan=3 | Elected in 1883.
| rowspan=6 nowrap | Mar 4, 1883 –Mar 3, 1895
| rowspan=6  | Republican
| rowspan=6 align=right | Charles F. Manderson
! rowspan=6 | 4

|- style="height:2em"
| 

|- style="height:2em"
! rowspan=3 | 4
| rowspan=3 align=left | Algernon Paddock
| rowspan=3  | Republican
| rowspan=3 nowrap | Mar 4, 1887 –Mar 3, 1893
| rowspan=3 | Elected in 1886.Retired.
| rowspan=3 | 5
| 

|- style="height:2em"
| 
| rowspan=3 | 5
| rowspan=3 | Re-elected in 1888.

|- style="height:2em"
| 

|- style="height:2em"
! rowspan=3 | 5
| rowspan=3 align=left | William V. Allen
| rowspan=3  | Populist
| rowspan=3 nowrap | Mar 4, 1893 –Mar 3, 1899
| rowspan=3 | Elected in 1893.Lost re-election.
| rowspan=3 | 6
| 

|- style="height:2em"
| 
| rowspan=6 | 6
| rowspan=6 | Elected in 1895.Retired.
| rowspan=6 nowrap | Mar 4, 1895 –Mar 3, 1901
| rowspan=6  | Republican
| rowspan=6 align=right | John Mellen Thurston
! rowspan=6 | 5

|- style="height:2em"
| 

|- style="height:2em"
| colspan=3 | Vacant
| nowrap | Mar 4, 1899 –Mar 8, 1899
| Legislature failed to elect.
| rowspan=7 | 7
| rowspan=4 

|- style="height:2em"
! 6
| align=left | Monroe Hayward
|  | Republican
| nowrap | Mar 8, 1899 –Dec 5, 1899
| Elected late.Died before qualifying.

|- style="height:2em"
| colspan=3 | Vacant
| nowrap | Dec 5, 1899 –Dec 13, 1899
|  

|- style="height:2em"
! rowspan=2 | 7
| rowspan=2 align=left | William V. Allen
| rowspan=2  | Populist
| rowspan=2 nowrap | Dec 13, 1899 –Mar 28, 1901
| rowspan=2 | Appointed to continue Hayward's term.Lost election to finish Hayward's term.

|- style="height:2em"
| rowspan=2 
| rowspan=4 | 7
| Legislature failed to elect
| nowrap | Mar 4, 1901 –Mar 28, 1901
| colspan=3 | Vacant

|- style="height:2em"
! rowspan=2 | 8
| rowspan=2 align=left | Charles H. Dietrich
| rowspan=2  | Republican
| rowspan=2 nowrap | Mar 28, 1901 –Mar 3, 1905
| rowspan=2 | Elected to finish Hayward's term.Retired.
| rowspan=3 | Elected in 1901 to finish vacant term.Retired.
| rowspan=3 nowrap | Mar 28, 1901 –Mar 3, 1907
| rowspan=3  | Republican
| rowspan=3 align=right | Joseph Millard
! rowspan=3 | 6

|- style="height:2em"
| 

|- style="height:2em"
! rowspan=3 | 9
| rowspan=3 align=left | Elmer Burkett
| rowspan=3  | Republican
| rowspan=3 nowrap | Mar 4, 1905 –Mar 3, 1911
| rowspan=3 | Elected in 1905.Lost renomination.
| rowspan=3 | 8
| 

|- style="height:2em"
| 
| rowspan=3 | 8
| rowspan=3 | Elected in 1907.Lost renomination.
| rowspan=3 nowrap | Mar 4, 1907 –Mar 3, 1913
| rowspan=3  | Republican
| rowspan=3 align=right | Norris Brown
! rowspan=3 | 7

|- style="height:2em"
| 

|- style="height:2em"
! rowspan=6 | 10
| rowspan=6 align=left | Gilbert Hitchcock
| rowspan=6  | Democratic
| rowspan=6 nowrap | Mar 4, 1911 –Mar 3, 1923
| rowspan=3 | Elected in 1911.
| rowspan=3 | 9
| 

|- style="height:2em"
| 
| rowspan=3 | 9
| rowspan=3 | Elected in 1913.
| rowspan=15 nowrap | Mar 4, 1913 –Jan 3, 1937
| rowspan=15  | Republican
| rowspan=18 align=right | George W. Norris
! rowspan=18 | 8

|- style="height:2em"
| 

|- style="height:2em"
| rowspan=3 | Re-elected in 1916.Lost re-election.
| rowspan=3 | 10
| 

|- style="height:2em"
| 
| rowspan=3 | 10
| rowspan=3 | Re-elected in 1918.

|- style="height:2em"
| 

|- style="height:2em"
! rowspan=6 | 11
| rowspan=6 align=left | Robert B. Howell
| rowspan=6  | Republican
| rowspan=6 nowrap | Mar 4, 1923 –Mar 11, 1933
| rowspan=3 | Elected in 1922.
| rowspan=3 | 11
| 

|- style="height:2em"
| 
| rowspan=3 | 11
| rowspan=3 | Re-elected in 1924.

|- style="height:2em"
| 

|- style="height:2em"
| rowspan=3 | Re-elected in 1928.Died.
| rowspan=6 | 12
| 

|- style="height:2em"
| 
| rowspan=6 | 12
| rowspan=6 | Re-elected in 1930.

|- style="height:2em"
| rowspan=4 

|- style="height:2em"
| colspan=3 | Vacant
| nowrap | Mar 11, 1933 –May 24, 1933
|  

|- style="height:2em"
! 12
| align=left |William H. Thompson
|  | Democratic
| nowrap | May 24, 1933 –Nov 6, 1934
| Appointed to continue Howell's term.Retired when successor qualified.

|- style="height:2em"
! 13
| align=left |Richard C. Hunter
|  | Democratic
| nowrap | Nov 7, 1934 –Jan 3, 1935
| Elected to finish Howell's term.Retired.

|- style="height:2em"
! rowspan=3 | 14
| rowspan=3 align=left | Edward R. Burke
| rowspan=3  | Democratic
| rowspan=3 nowrap | Jan 3, 1935 –Jan 3, 1941
| rowspan=3 | Elected in 1934.Lost renomination.
| rowspan=3 | 13
| 

|- style="height:2em"
| 
| rowspan=3 | 13
| rowspan=3 | Re-elected in 1936.Lost re-election.
| rowspan=3 nowrap | Jan 3, 1937 –Jan 3, 1943
| rowspan=3  | Independent

|- style="height:2em"
| 

|- style="height:2em"
! rowspan=12 | 15
| rowspan=12 align=left | Hugh A. Butler
| rowspan=12  | Republican
| rowspan=12 nowrap | Jan 3, 1941 –Jul 1, 1954
| rowspan=3 | Elected in 1940.
| rowspan=3 | 14
| 

|- style="height:2em"
| 
| rowspan=3 | 14
| rowspan=3 | Elected in 1942.
| rowspan=5 nowrap | Jan 3, 1943 –Nov 29, 1951
| rowspan=5  | Republican
| rowspan=5 align=right | Kenneth S. Wherry
! rowspan=5 | 9

|- style="height:2em"
| 

|- style="height:2em"
| rowspan=6 | Re-elected in 1946.
| rowspan=6 | 15
| 

|- style="height:2em"
| 
| rowspan=13 | 15
| rowspan=2 | Re-elected in 1948.Died.

|- style="height:2em"
| rowspan=4 

|- style="height:2em"
|  
| nowrap | Nov 29, 1951 –Dec 10, 1951
| colspan=3 | Vacant

|- style="height:2em"
| Appointed to continue Wherry's term.Retired when successor elected.
| nowrap | Dec 10, 1951 –Nov 4, 1952
|  | Republican
| align=right | Fred A. Seaton
! 10

|- style="height:2em"
| rowspan=2 | Elected to finish Wherry's term.Died.
| rowspan=2 nowrap | Nov 5, 1952 –Apr 12, 1954
| rowspan=2  | Republican
| rowspan=2 align=right | Dwight Griswold
! rowspan=2 | 11

|- style="height:2em"
| rowspan=3 | Re-elected in 1952.Died.
| rowspan=10 | 16
| rowspan=8 

|- style="height:2em"
|  
| nowrap | Apr 12, 1954 –Apr 16, 1954
| colspan=3 | Vacant

|- style="height:2em"
| rowspan=2 | Appointed to continue Griswold's term.Retired when successor elected.
| rowspan=2  | Apr 16, 1954 –Nov 7, 1954
| rowspan=2  | Republican
| rowspan=2 align=right | Eva Bowring
! rowspan=2 | 12

|- style="height:2em"
| rowspan=2 colspan=3 | Vacant
| rowspan=2 nowrap | Jul 1, 1954 –Jul 3, 1954
| rowspan=2 |  

|- style="height:2em"
| rowspan=3 | Elected to finish Griswold's term.Resigned.
| rowspan=3 nowrap | Nov 8, 1954 –Dec 31, 1954
| rowspan=3  | Republican
| rowspan=3 align=right | Hazel Abel
! rowspan=3 | 13

|- style="height:2em"
! 16
| align=left | Samuel W. Reynolds
|  | Republican
| nowrap | Jul 3, 1954 –Nov 7, 1954
| Appointed to continue Butler's term.Retired when successor qualified.

|- style="height:2em"
! rowspan=13 | 17
| rowspan=13 align=left | Roman Hruska
| rowspan=13  | Republican
| rowspan=13 nowrap | Nov 8, 1954 –Dec 27, 1976
| rowspan=4 | Elected to finish Butler's term.

|- style="height:2em"
| Appointed to finish Griswold's term, having already been elected to the next term.
| rowspan=14 nowrap | Jan 1, 1955 –Jan 3, 1979
| rowspan=14  | Republican
| rowspan=14 align=right | Carl Curtis
! rowspan=14 | 14

|- style="height:2em"
| 
| rowspan=3 | 16
| rowspan=3 | Elected in 1954.

|- style="height:2em"
| 

|- style="height:2em"
| rowspan=3 | Re-elected in 1958.
| rowspan=3 | 17
| 

|- style="height:2em"
| 
| rowspan=3 | 17
| rowspan=3 | Re-elected in 1960.

|- style="height:2em"
| 

|- style="height:2em"
| rowspan=3 | Re-elected in 1964.
| rowspan=3 | 18
| 

|- style="height:2em"
| 
| rowspan=3 | 18
| rowspan=3 | Re-elected in 1966.

|- style="height:2em"
| 

|- style="height:2em"
| rowspan=3 | Re-elected in 1970.Retired and resigned early.
| rowspan=4 | 18
| 

|- style="height:2em"
| 
| rowspan=4 | 19
| rowspan=4 | Re-elected in 1972.Retired.

|- style="height:2em"
| rowspan=2 

|- style="height:2em"
! rowspan=7 | 18
| rowspan=7 align=left | Edward Zorinsky
| rowspan=7  | Democratic
| rowspan=7 nowrap | Dec 28, 1976 –Mar 6, 1987
| Appointed to finish Hruska's term, having been elected to the next term.

|- style="height:2em"
| rowspan=3 | Elected in 1976.
| rowspan=3 | 19
| 

|- style="height:2em"
| 
| rowspan=3 | 20
| rowspan=3 | Elected in 1978.
| rowspan=11 nowrap | Jan 3, 1979 –Jan 3, 1997
| rowspan=11  | Democratic
| rowspan=11 align=right | J. James Exon
! rowspan=11 | 15

|- style="height:2em"
| 

|- style="height:2em"
| rowspan=3 | Re-elected in 1982.Died.
| rowspan=5 | 20
| 

|- style="height:2em"
| 
| rowspan=5 | 21
| rowspan=5 | Re-elected in 1984.

|- style="height:2em"
| rowspan=3 

|- style="height:2em"
| colspan=3 | Vacant
| nowrap | Mar 6, 1987 –Mar 11, 1987
|  

|- style="height:2em"
! 19
| align=left | David Karnes
|  | Republican
| nowrap | Mar 11, 1987 – Jan 3, 1989
| Appointed to finish Zorinsky's term.Lost election to full term.

|- style="height:2em"
! rowspan=6 | 20
| rowspan=6 align=left | Bob Kerrey
| rowspan=6  | Democratic
| rowspan=6 nowrap | Jan 3, 1989 –Jan 3, 2001
| rowspan=3 | Elected in 1988.
| rowspan=3 | 21
| 

|- style="height:2em"
| 
| rowspan=3 | 22
| rowspan=3 | Re-elected in 1990.Retired.

|- style="height:2em"
| 

|- style="height:2em"
| rowspan=3 | Re-elected in 1994.Retired.
| rowspan=3 | 22
| 

|- style="height:2em"
| 
| rowspan=3 | 23
| rowspan=3 | Elected in 1996.
| rowspan=6 nowrap | Jan 3, 1997 –Jan 3, 2009
| rowspan=6  | Republican
| rowspan=6 align=right | Chuck Hagel
! rowspan=6 | 16

|- style="height:2em"
| 

|- style="height:2em"
! rowspan=6 | 21
| rowspan=6 align=left | Ben Nelson
| rowspan=6  | Democratic
| rowspan=6 nowrap | Jan 3, 2001 –Jan 3, 2013
| rowspan=3 | Elected in 2000.
| rowspan=3 | 24
| 

|- style="height:2em"
| 
| rowspan=3 | 24
| rowspan=3 | Re-elected in 2002.Retired.

|- style="height:2em"
| 

|- style="height:2em"
| rowspan=3 | Re-elected in 2006.Retired.
| rowspan=3 | 25
| 

|- style="height:2em"
| 
| rowspan=3 | 25
| rowspan=3 | Elected in 2008.Retired.
| rowspan=3 nowrap | Jan 3, 2009 –Jan 3, 2015
| rowspan=3  | Republican
| rowspan=3 align=right | Mike Johanns
! rowspan=3 | 17

|- style="height:2em"
| 

|- style="height:2em"
! rowspan=8 | 22
| rowspan=8 align=left | Deb Fischer
| rowspan=8  | Republican
| rowspan=8 nowrap | Jan 3, 2013 –Present
| rowspan=3 | Elected in 2012.
| rowspan=3 | 26
| 

|- style="height:2em"
| 
| rowspan=3 | 26
| rowspan=3 | Elected in 2014.
| rowspan=5 nowrap | Jan 3, 2015 –Jan 8, 2023
| rowspan=5  | Republican
| rowspan=5 align=right | Ben Sasse
! rowspan=5 | 18

|- style="height:2em"
| 

|- style="height:2em"
| rowspan=5 | Re-elected in 2018.
| rowspan=5 | 27
| 

|- style="height:2em"
| 
| rowspan=5 | 27
| rowspan=2 | Re-elected in 2020.Resigned to become President of the University of Florida.

|- style="height:2em"
| rowspan="3" 

|- style="height:2em"
| 
| nowrap | Jan 8, 2023 –Jan 12, 2023
| colspan=3 | Vacant

|- style="height:2em"
| Appointed to continue Sasse's term.
| Jan 12, 2023 –Present
|  | Republican
| align=right | Pete Ricketts
! 19

|- style="height:2em"
| rowspan=2 colspan=5 | To be determined in the 2024 election.
| rowspan=2|28
| 
| colspan=5 | To be determined in the 2024 special election.

|- style="height:2em"
| 
| 28
| colspan=5 | To be determined in the 2026 election.

See also

 United States congressional delegations from Nebraska
 List of United States representatives from Nebraska
 Elections in Nebraska

References

 
United States Senators
Nebraska